The padrino system, or patronage in Filipino culture and politics, is the value system where one gains favor, promotion, or political appointment through family affiliation (nepotism) or friendship (cronyism), as opposed to one's merit. The system traces its origins to the Spanish colonial period where Filipinos were forced to obtain the consent of the Spanish or a wealthy fellow Filipino, usually a friar, to occupy a government position or improve their social or economic status. The padrino system in the Philippines has been the source of many controversies and corruption.

In the executive 
The padrino system sometimes exists in Executive, due to the leader's allegiance to his or her party, supporters and contributors.

In the legislative 
The Constitution of the Philippines in many ways has laid down the foundations against nepotism, cronyism, and oligarchical rule of the few.

The issue of political dynasties has always been touched, especially during elections, but the subject has been much avoided by politicians alike who have a wife, son, daughter, or a relative sitting in office as well.

When the pork barrel scam broke out, Senator Jinggoy Estrada claimed that Pres. Benigno Aquino III used the Disbursement Acceleration Program to influence the 188 Congressional Representatives and 20 Senators to approve the impeachment complaint against Renato Corona. On July 2, 2014, the Supreme Court decision on DAP was ruled as unconstitutional.

In the military 
The Armed Forces of the Philippines (AFP) was known as one of the best in the post-World War geopolitical scene in Southeast Asia, if not the whole of Asia. Majority of the officers were graduates from the West Point-styled Philippine Military Academy.

In order to get a higher rank or office, one must have at least known or befriend a high-ranking official to be promoted.

In the society

Efforts to combat padrino system 
In September 2008, Senator Miriam Defensor-Santiago passed Senate Bill No. 2616, or the "Anti-Political Recommendation Act", however this as usual has been shelved for the time being and is currently pending at the Committee level. She once again urged its passage in 2013, in response to accounts of the so-called "three kings" of the Bureau of Customs being supported by influential backers – Carlos So (backed by Iglesia ni Cristo), Rogel Gatchalian (claimed to be an associate of then-Senate Minority Leader Juan Ponce Enrile), and Ricardo Belmonte (then-House Speaker Feliciano Belmonte Jr.'s soon-to-retire brother) – during that year.

Senatorial candidate Diosdado Valeroso, a former police chief superintendent, in Rappler's senatorial debate on April 22, 2016, proposed a meritocracy bill that would shield law enforcement agencies and government employees from political influence, most especially from the padrino system.

See also 
Corruption in the Philippines
Spoils system, 19th century American equivalent

References 

Politics of the Philippines
Corruption in the Philippines
Philippine culture